The All Malaysia Indian Progressive Front, abbrev: AMIPF, or better known just as the Indian Progressive Front (IPF), is a Malaysian political party. It is a splinter party of the Malaysian Indian Congress (MIC) formed by its dissident leader M. G. Pandithan in 1990. The party was a component of the defunct opposition coalition, Gagasan Rakyat (GR) from 1990 to 1996, but it currently supports the Barisan Nasional (BN) coalition although it is not a component member. IPF had failed in its application to join BN after an objection from MIC. Instead it is being considered just as a 'Friends of BN' party. Prime Minister Mahathir Mohamad said the party has played a positive role in enhancing the image of Barisan Nasional, especially among the Indian community.

General election results

See also
List of political parties in Malaysia 
Politics of Malaysia

References

External links
 
 

Political parties established in 1990
1990 establishments in Malaysia
Political parties in Malaysia
Political parties of minorities
Identity politics
Indian-Malaysian culture
Indian National Congress breakaway groups